Robert Henry Adams (December 14, 1921 – February 13, 1997) was an American professional baseball third baseman and second baseman. He played in Major League Baseball from 1946 through 1959 for the Cincinnati Reds / Redlegs, Chicago White Sox, Baltimore Orioles and Chicago Cubs. He was born in Tuolumne County, California.

In a 14-season career, Adams posted a .269 batting average with 37 home runs and 303 RBI in 1281 games played.

Adams started his Major League career in 1946 with Cincinnati as their regular second baseman. Despite his infield background, the next five years he served mostly as a backup for Grady Hatton (3B) and Connie Ryan (2B). Finally, Adams became the regular third baseman for Cincinnati in 1951. He also was considered in National League MVP voting.

In the 1955 midseason, Adams was purchased by the Chicago White Sox. Traded to the Baltimore Orioles before 1956, he also played for the Chicago Cubs from 1957 to 1959, helping young infielders improve their play.

Following his playing career, Adams continued as a coach with the Cubs and was a member of the team's  experimental College of Coaches. In 1966, the organization named him club president of the Triple-A Tacoma Cubs of the Pacific Coast League. But Adams’ six-year tenure in Tacoma ended after the 1971 season, when Chicago moved its Triple-A affiliate to Wichita, Kansas. After that, he again coached for the Cubs, in 1973, then retired from baseball.

Bobby Adams died in Gig Harbor, Washington, at age 75.

Facts
Adams hit a leadoff homerun against Robin Roberts that end up being the only hit the Cincinnati  Redlegs get in the 8–1 loss on May 13, 1954
Brother of 1B Dick Adams and father of OF Mike Adams.

See also
List of second generation MLB players

External links

Bobby Adams at The Deadball Era

1921 births
1997 deaths
Baseball players from California
Major League Baseball second basemen
Major League Baseball third basemen
Cincinnati Reds players
Cincinnati Redlegs players
Chicago White Sox players
Baltimore Orioles players
Ogden Reds players
Columbia Reds players
San Antonio Missions managers
Seattle Rainiers players
Portland Beavers players
Syracuse Chiefs players
Miami Marlins (IL) players
San Antonio Missions players
Chicago Cubs players
Chicago Cubs coaches
United States Army Air Forces personnel of World War II
People from Tuolumne County, California